This is a list of players, past and present, who have been capped by their country in international football whilst playing for USM Blida. a further 5 nations have fielded USM Blida players in their international sides.

Players

Algerien players

Foreign players

Players in international competitions

African Cup Players

1998 African Cup
  Billal Zouani

2002 African Cup
  Salah Samadi
  Smail Diss
  Kamel Kherkhache

2004 African Cup
  Amadou Tidiane Tall

External links
FIFA.com
DzFoot
web.archive.org
National Football Teams

References

USM Blida
USM Blida players
USM Blida international
Association football player non-biographical articles
Lists of international association football players by club